The Hong Kong Sze Yap Commercial & Industrial Association Chan Lai So Chun Memorial School or simply Chan Lai So Chun Memorial School was a primary school founded by the Hong Kong Sze Yap Commercial & Industrial Association in Cheung Ching Estate on the Tsing Yi Island, Hong Kong.

History
Opened in 1977, the school was the first primary school on a public housing estate on Tsing Yi Island.

Future
With an ever decreasing birth rate in Hong Kong, the primary school closed after summer 2006. All the pupils transferred to TWGHs Chow Yin Sum Primary School. 

In October 2011, Hong Kong government announced demolition of the school.

References

External links
Official Website
School details

Tsing Yi
Primary schools in Hong Kong
Educational institutions established in 1977
1977 establishments in Hong Kong
Defunct schools in Hong Kong